Shadows of Desire is a 1994 television film starring Nicollette Sheridan, Joe Lando, Adrian Pasdar, Richard Roundtree, Piper Laurie and Brandon Smith. It was directed by Sam Pillsbury and written by Joyce Eliason. The film score was composed by Mark Snow.

Plot

External links

1994 films
1994 television films
1994 romantic drama films
Films scored by Mark Snow
Films directed by Sam Pillsbury